Juan Ignacio Torres Landa (died June 7, 2013) was a Mexican politician, who was the President of the Chamber of Deputies (1992).

Landa died in a helicopter crash at the age of 57.

References

2013 deaths
Members of the Chamber of Deputies (Mexico)
Presidents of the Chamber of Deputies (Mexico)
Institutional Revolutionary Party politicians
Year of birth missing